Matteo Vito Lomolino (born 11 March 1996) is an Italian football player who plays as a defender.

Club career
He made his professional debut in the Lega Pro for Savona on 30 September 2015 in a game against Pontedera.

On 31 July 2019, he signed a two-year contract with Carpi.

International
He represented Italy national under-17 football team at the 2013 UEFA European Under-17 Championship, where Italy was the runner-up, and at the 2013 FIFA U-17 World Cup.

References

External links
 

1996 births
Living people
Footballers from Milan
Italian footballers
Association football defenders
Serie C players
Inter Milan players
Savona F.B.C. players
F.C. Südtirol players
A.C. Cuneo 1905 players
A.C.N. Siena 1904 players
Trapani Calcio players
A.C. Carpi players
Italy youth international footballers